Neil Tucker (9 May 1915 – 6 October 1981) was an Australian rules footballer who played with Carlton and Geelong in the Victorian Football League (VFL).

Tucker was one of four players that left Geelong and play with Carlton during the Second World War. Geelong spent two years in recess, 1942 and 1943, during that time Tucker managed two games with Carlton. When Geelong returned to competition in 1944, so did Tucker.

Notes

External links 

Neil Tucker's profile at Blueseum

1915 births
1981 deaths
Carlton Football Club players
Geelong Football Club players
Australian rules footballers from Victoria (Australia)
Geelong West Football Club players